Ch'iyar Qirini (Aymara ch'iyara black, qiri scale, -ni a suffix to indicate ownership, "the one with a black scale", also spelled Charquerini, Chiar Kherini) is a  mountain in the Cordillera Real in the Bolivian Andes, north-east of La Paz. It lies in the La Paz Department, Murillo Province, La Paz Municipality, near the border with the El Alto Municipality. Ch'iyar Qirini is situated north-east of the mountain Chacaltaya and north of the two Qillwani Lakes.

References 

Mountains of La Paz Department (Bolivia)